Hamilton Family Estate is a set of nine historic homes located in the Spruce Hill, Philadelphia, Pennsylvania. They were built between about 1853 and 1863, and are representative examples of the Italianate-style of architecture.  They are commonly built of stucco and masonry, with porches and bracketed cornices.  The houses at 400 S. 40th Street and 4000 and 4002 Pine Street are believed to have been designed by architect Samuel Sloan.

It was added to the National Register of Historic Places in 1979.

See also
 Hamilton family

References

Houses on the National Register of Historic Places in Philadelphia
Italianate architecture in Pennsylvania
Houses completed in 1863
Spruce Hill, Philadelphia